The paleofauna of the Eocene Okanagan Highlands is comprised of Early Eocene arthropods, vertebrates, plus rare nematodes and molluscs found in geological formations of the northwestern North American Eocene Okanagan Highlands.  The highlands lake bed series' as a whole are considered one of the great Canadian Lagerstätten. The paleofauna represents that of a late Ypresian upland temperate ecosystem immediately after the Paleocene-Eocene thermal maximum, and before the increased cooling of the middle and late Eocene to Oligocene. The fossiliferous deposits of the region were noted as early as 1873, with small amounts of systematic work happening in the 1880-90s on British Columbian sites, and 1920-30s for Washington sites. Focus and more detailed descriptive work on the Okanagan Highlands site started in the last 1970's.  Most of the highlands sites are preserved as compression-impression fossils in "shales", but also includes a rare permineralized biota and an amber biota.

Extent
The  series of lacustrine deposits are located across the Central British Columbia, Canada southeast to northern central Washington state, United States.  grouped informally into "Northern", "Central", and "Southern" sites.  The Northern sites consist of unnamed Ootsa Group formations which outcrop as the "Driftwood shales" near Smithers, British Columbia, the "Horsefly shales", of an unnamed formation and unnamed group which outcrop around Horsefly, British Columbia, and possibly sites now considered lost in the Quesnel, British Columbia area, The Central sites represent Kamloops Group formations with the McAbee Fossil Beds, Tranquille River site and Falkland site, all in the Tranquille Formation, the Quichena site and Stump Lake site in the Coldwater Beds and outcrops of the Chu Chua Formation near Barriere, British Columbia.  The Southern sites include the Princeton Group Allenby Formation sites surrounding Princeton, British Columbia, such as "Nine Mile Creek", "One Mile Creek", "Pleasant Valley", "Thomas Ranch", "Vermilian Bluffs", and "Whipsaw Creek". The Penticton Groups Kettle River, Marama and Marron Formations in the Boundary District along the Canada-United States border are closely correlated with the Klondike Mountain Formation across the boarder. The most southerly of the Okanagan Highlands lakes, the Klondike Mountain Formation in Northern Ferry County, Washington include the "Boot Hill site", "Corner Lot site", "Gold Mountain site", "Knob Hill site", and "Mount Elizabeth site".

There is debate as to the affiliation of the, potentially lost, Quesnel sites with the Greater Okanagan Highlands.  Archibald et al (2018) in a monograph of the Highlands Hymenoptera families included them as part of the series.  However the certainty for the placement was questioned earlier by Eberle et al. (2017) and Archibald and Cannings (2022) who opted to tentatively exclude Quesnel from the highlands while discussing the history of field colleting in the region.

Paleofauna

The Okanagan highlands represent a snapshot of lake, wetlands, and montane forest animal life which existed approximately  after the Cretaceous–Paleogene extinction event.  The temperate upland lakes hosted insects, fish, birds, and mammals with the notably well preserved megafossils often retaining insect colour patterns, gnat wing membrane hairs, and whole bird feathers. In some cases the fine detail preservation of soft parts allows for the preservation of internal anatomy.

Archibald and Makarkin (2006) suggested the disjunct distribution of genera between the Danish western Limfjord coasts Fur Formation and the Okanagan highlands may have been enabled by rising crust elevations in the northern Atlantic region and subsequent increase in landmass during the Late Paleocene which linked Northern Europe with Greenland until at least the Early Eocene. Several land bridge routes may have acted as migration corridors for biotic interchange, the northern De Geer land bridge from Fennoscandia to North America via northern Greenland, and the southern Thulean land bridge from northern Britain though the Faroe Islands and then Greenland and North America.  Several insect genera share disjunct distributions between the highlands and Limfjord including the mecopteran Cimbrophlebia, the giant lacewing Palaeopsychops, the green lacewing Protochrysa, the bull dog ant Ypresiomyrma.

The Hat Creek Amber deposits in the central region provide evidence for small and microbiotic elements of the Okanagan Highlands forests though entombed organisms such at terrestrial nematodes and microwasps that otherwise would likely not be preserved in the lake environments. The highlands as a whole have been described as one of the "Great Canadian Lagerstätten" based on the diversity, quality and unique nature of the biotas that are preserved. The highlands temperate biome, preserved across a large transect of lakes, recorded many of the earliest appearances of modern genera, while also documenting the last stands of ancient lines. David Grimaldi et al. (2018) during discussion of inclusions in Alaskan Chickaloon amber, noted the Okanagan Highlands record of latitudinal extinctions, specifically the modern southern hemisphere endemic groups Eomeropidae mecopterans and Myrmeciinae bulldog ants.

Lithology
The majority of the lake deposits are compression fossils in lake bed sediments noted for both the paleofauna and paleofloras, with an additional pair of important non-compression biotas.  A permineralized chert flora, the Princeton Chert is found along the Similkameen River interbedded with coal deposits of the Ashnola shale unit, Allenby Formation known for anatomically preserved plants.  In the Central sites, subbituminous coal of the Hat Creek Coalfield around Hat Creek hosts an entombment biota, the Hat Creek amber, which preserves highlands faunal elements that are not found in the compression biotas. Initial discussion of the amber presented by George Poinar, Jr. et al. (1999) suggested the Hat Creek amber producing tree was likely to be an araucarian tree in the genus Agathis, based on unreported magnetic resonance spectroscopic analysis and earlier reports of the genus in Mesozoic Canada.  A purported occurrence of Araucaria at the McAbee site was used as additional support for the ambers origin. The Agathis origin for Canadian Mesozoic amber was later called into question by Ryan McKellar and Alexander Wolfe (2010) based on a lack of any araucarian macrofossil history in the northern hemisphere the McAbee fossils having been already reidentifed as from the cupressaceous Cunninghamia.  Based on Fourier-transform infrared spectroscopic analysis and associated amber inclusion fossils, they suggested the Mesozoic ambers of Canada to be from the extinct cupressaceous genus Parataxodium.  The origin of the Hat Creek ambers was further noted as likely from a cupressaceous source by Grimaldi et al. (2018) who call out a primary floral component of the host coal being Metasequoia and that the coeval Puget Group Tiger Mountain amber of Washington state is also of Metasequoia origins.  They hypothesize that the major amber producing plant of the Paleocene Pacific Northwest forests as Metasequoia, but note that further investigation of Chickaloon, Hat Creek, Coalmont, and Tiger Mountain ambers would be needed.

Mollusks
Mollusks are a rare component of the highlands, usually being mentioned only in passing by Mark Wilson (1977, 1978) and with fossils being reported from three sites only.  Unidentified small bivalve fossils were mentioned from the Pleasant Valley site by Wilson (1977) and the Quilchena site by Wilson (1987), while unidentified gastropods were briefly mentioned by Kathleen Pigg et al. (2018).

Nematodes
In the initial description of Hat Creek Amber, Poinar et al. make note of nematode specimens found in the deposit, with a brief commentary regarding them as the oldest terrestrial free-living nematode fossils to have been found up to that point, but did not give any specific taxonomic identification beyond that.

Arachnids
A single arachnid has been described fully from the Okanagan highlands, the Nursery web spider Palaeoperenethis thaleri, known from an adult male.  This spider was likely aquatic as are the other members of the family, and based on morphological similarities, it was possibly closer in relation to African and Asian species in the Perenethis genus group then to the only modern genus in British Columbia Dolomedes.  Another spider specimen, University of Alberta 5007 was noted by Wilson (1977) from the Kamloops area, and unspecified spider compression fossils were mentioned as occurring in passing by David Greenwood et al. (2005) while discussing the increasing taxonomic richness of the highlands, but without specific site information. Additionally, undiscussed amber fossils were mentioned by Poinar et al. (1999) in their initial report of Hat Creek amber inclusions.  Other arachnid evidence has been recovered in the form of fossil hymenopterans placed in families known predate or parasitize spiders.  A diverse undescribed fauna of the "parasitoid" wasp family Ichneumonidae is known, some species of which are known to parasitize eggs or adult spiders.  Another family, Sphecidae, which is a documented opportunistic predator of spiders and certain insets is known from a few isolated fossils at McAbee and Republic. Lastly the vespoid family Pompilidae has been found at both McAbee and Republic.  This family, known as spider wasps, are behaviorally specialized as predators of spiders and a few other arachnids, provisioning newly laid eggs with a single spider as a larder to feed on while developing.

Crustaceans
The earliest report of Crayfish from the highlands was by Wesley Wehr and Lisa Barksdale (1995).  In a short Washington Geology article they reported the first identified occurrence of feathers from the Klondike Mountain Formation and crayfish from both there and the McAbee site.  At that time, the moulted carapace section from Republic was not identified further than as a freshwater crayfish. The McAbee specimen was tentatively identified, from photograph, as being a possible Procambarus species fossil by malacologist Rodney M. Feldmann.  Subsequently an additional series of over ten fossils were recovered from McAbee and described in 2011 as Aenigmastacus crandalli by Feldmann, Carrie Schweitzer, and John Leahy.  A. crandalli was placed in the southern hemisphere superfamily Parastacoidea based on several morphological characters, and they noted this species to be the only northern hemisphere member of the superfamily.

At the Quilchena site, brief mention was reported in 2016 of ostracod fossils, though no further discussion or description has happened.

Insects

Blattodea
In the initial description of Hat Creek Amber, Poinar et al. make note of a single adult Corydiinae cockroach specimen found in the amber, with a brief commentary on the modern tropical-subtropical distribution of that subfamily and a lack of any native cockroach species in western Canada, but did not give any specific taxonomic identification for the specimen beyond that.

Coleopterans
Hat Creek amber has provided one fully described beetle species Prionocerites tattriei, which is known from a larval stage specimen first reported by Poinar et al. (1999).  The species and genus were the first North American taxon from the family to be described.

Dermapterans
Earwig fossils were first noted from republic by paleoentomologist Standley Lewis (1992) in his initial report of the insect diversity at Republic.  He noted the fossils to be some of the oldest Eocene demapterans in North America at that time and figured one undescribed specimen consisting of a females abdomen section and cerci.  Lewis (1994) tentatively identified the earwigs as members of family Forficulidae based on the shape of the cerci, and illustrated four female fossils, identified as such from the simple straight nature of the cercus. Lewis also suggested two different species were present, based on the differing lengths of the female cerci.

Dipterans
The most common animal fossils at many of the highlands sites are bibionid march flies,  with over twenty species from the genera Penthetria and Plecia described. The modern diversity of the family is greatest in lower latitudes, and Plecia only reaches northward to the warm temperate areas of southeastern North America. In the initial description of Hat Creek Amber, Poinar et al. make note of dipteran inclusions found in the deposit but did not give any specific taxonomic identification of taxa or illustrate any specimen.

Ephemeropterans

Hemipterans
Greenwood et al. (2005) briefly discussed the prevalence of Aphid fossils at highlands sites where the taphonomic factors allowed for fine detail preservation such as in the Driftwood shales. Poinar et al. (1999) made note of hemipteran specimens found in Hat Creek Amber but did not give any specific taxonomic identification or illustrate any specimens.

Hymenopterans
Archibald, Mathewes, & Aase (2023) reported a Titanomyrma species ant queen from Allenby Formation, and noted the range extension for Formiciinae into the highlands, as the subfamily was previously considered a strictly thermophilic ant group. Due to complications arising from preservational distortion during diagenesis, they were unable to determine the correct size of the queen in life. Conversely stretching the fossil to bilateral symmetry results in a larger  length estimate, placing it as comparable to queens of T. lubei and T. simillima.

Lepidoptera
A solitary lepidopteran fossil has been recovered, but no full descriptive work has been made on the specimen, aside from a single PhD dissertation. Early examination placed the moth in the family Geometridae, but later work has identified it as the oldest member of the tiger moth subfamily Arctiinae.

Mecopterans

Neuropterans

Odonata
Trace fossil evidence of damselflys has been recorded from oviposition scars on various leaves from the Klondike Mountain Formation that have been placed in the ichnogenus Paleoovoidus.  Lewis and Carrol (1991) originally identified the damage on an Alnus parvifolia leaf as caused by leaf beetles of the genus Altica.  This was later questioned by Conrad Labandeira who noted the scar patterns did not match modern Altica egg laying behaviour.

Orthoptera

Phasmatodea

Psocodea
The only reported Psocodea fossils from the highlands are known from Hat Creek amber.  They were mentioned, as "Psocoptera", in passing by Poinar et al. (1999) who did not give any finer taxonomic detail or illustrate any specimens.

Raphidiopterans

Thrysanoptera
Poinar et al. (1999) illustrated a Thrips specimen in Hat Creek amber and noted the presence of the order in the fossils they examined, however they did not provide any finer taxonomic details on the affinities of the fossils.

Trichoptera
Trichopterans are known mainly from laraval cases and occasional isolated wings.

Vertebrates

Fish
The first fish to be described from the Okanagan Highlands were recovered from Allenby Formation shales and subsequently studied by Edward Drinker Cope who named Amyzon brevipinne in 1894.  The next descriptive work for a fish came in 1916 with the naming of "Lucious" rosei by Louis Hussakof from Tranquille Formation fossils collected at "Red point" on Kamloops Lake in 1914.  "Lucious" rosei was redescribed in 1966 by Ted Cavander, who moved the species to a new genus Eohiodon placed into the mooneye family Hiodontidae.  The largest body of work for fish of the Highlands was by Mark Wilson (1977) who published a monograph detailing the Canadian highlands formations fish fauna, naming four new species in three new genera, plus redescribing both "Amyzon" brevipinne and "Eohiodon" rosei.  The monograph added the families Salmonidae with Eosalmo driftwoodensis, Libotoniidae with Libotonius blakeburnensis, and Moronidae with Priscacara aquilonia.  A year later the first species from the Republic area, "Eohiodon" woodruffi was described by Wilson, and the second Republic species Libotonius pearsoni followed in 1979. in 1982 the final new fish species named from the highlands , Amia hesperia, was described, being initially placed by Wilson in the modern bowfin genus Amia.  This placement was later questioned by Lance Grande and William Bemis (1998), who noted that due to preservational orientation of the A. hesperia holotype, generic placement of the species was problematic. Phylogenetic analysis of Amiidae fossils by Grande and Bemis found the fossil as a member of the amiinae subfamily, but with key mouth anatomy missing, were unable to determine if Amia or the extinct genus Cyclurus was correct.  In 2021 fossils of "Amyzon" brevipinne were redescribed by Juan Liu based on the holotype and additional fossils from the Allenby Formation, and based on the anatomical differences between the species and the type species of Amyzon mentale determined that the Princeton fossils were part of a different genus.  As such Liu moved the species to the new genus Wilsonium.

Reptiles
The only reptile fossils known from the Okanagan highlands come from the Allenby Formation.  A soft-shelled turtle is known from the "Ashnola shales" unit and unidentified turtle bone are known from the interbedded Princeton Chert. The soft shelled turtle was first discovered by James Basinger from dark shale layers above the chert and reported by Wilson (1982).  The unidentified turtle bones were found preserved within the chert layers and first reported by Stockey and Pigg (1994).

Mammals
Eocene mammals are exclusively known from sites in, or possibly in, the Okanagan Highlands. The earliest reported mammals were of teeth from the Princeton area in 1935, with one of the fossils subsequently being "lost". More recent work in 2014 and 2017 on fossils from Driftwood and Princeton have expanded the mammal families to three, possibly four, and an undescribed Quilchena fossil being identified as a "lipotyphla". The record of Brontotheriidae is uncertain due to the split opinion regarding inclusion of the Quesnel area sediments as part of the Highlands.

Birds
A small avifauna is known from the Okanagan Highlands, but due to the incomplete nature of the fossils, placement of studied specimens has been tentative at best. Gerald Mayr et al. (2019) published an initial overview of the fossils with descriptions and commentary of the material, noting the taxa identified were all previously unknown to Northwestern North American Eocene sites. Despite the tentative nature of the fossil identifications, the Highlands sites are the richest Paleogene avifauna described from Canada. Mayr et al. (2019) posited that the fossils likely represent the more common species in the avifauna of the Highlands, but at the same time, include taxa that are considered rare or absent in the most studied avifaunas from the same time frame.

Isolated feathers are also known from several of the sites and have not described in detail.

Quesnelian fauna
If the Quesnel sites with the are included as part of the Greater Okanagan Highlands per Archibald et al (2018) the fauna of the region is expanded by a number of insect taxa, an additional arachnid, and a brontothere.

Arachnids

Coleopterans

Dipterans

Hemipterans

Hymenopterans

Neuroptera

Mammals

References

Geology of the Rocky Mountains
Paleogene geology of Washington (state)
Paleontology in Washington (state)
Ypresian North America
Paleontology in British Columbia